General W. C. Gorgas may refer to:

People
William C. Gorgas (1854-1920), a United States Army officer and physician known for fighting tropical disease

Ships
USS General W. C. Gorgas (ID-1365), a United States Navy troop transport in commission in 1919
USAT General W. C. Gorgas (1902), a United States Army Transport in service from 1941 to 1945